Spasova is a rural locality (a village) in Leninskoye Rural Settlement, Kudymkarsky District, Perm Krai, Russia. The population was 7 as of 2010.

Geography 
Spasova is located 22 km south of Kudymkar (the district's administrative centre) by road. Shaydyrova is the nearest rural locality.

References 

Rural localities in Kudymkarsky District